Bernard Njoka Mutani was the sixth Member of Parliament for Nithi Constituency in Kenya.

Mutani was elected Nithi parliamentary seats twice, in 1992 and 1997. In 1999, his victory was nullified by the court. Having been barred from participating in the bi-election, Mutani retired from national politics. Mutani died on 24 June 2011.

References 

Year of birth missing
2011 deaths
Members of the National Assembly (Kenya)